Ardeer Thistle Football Club are a Scottish football club from Stevenston in North Ayrshire. Formed as a Juvenile Club in 1900, they moved up to the Juniors in season 1902–03 and are based at Ardeer Stadium.

Honours
Ayrshire District League runners-up: 2013-14
Western League Winners: 1924–25, 1959–60
Ayrshire Second Division winners: 1991–92
Ayrshire Junior Cup Winners: 1924–25, 1925–26, 1959–60, 1965–66
Western League Cup Winners: 1925–26, 1959–60, 1960–61
Irvine & District Cup Winners: 1906–07, 1907–08, 1908–09, 1915–16, 1925–26, 1961–62, 1962–63

Notable players

 Andy Auld (1919–1921)
 Alessandro Zarrelli (2006–2008)
 Ross Stewart (2013–2015)
 George Bonner (2019–2019)

External links
 Official website
 facebook
 twitter

 
Football clubs in Scotland
Scottish Junior Football Association clubs
Football in North Ayrshire
Association football clubs established in 1900
1900 establishments in Scotland
West of Scotland Football League teams
Ardrossan−Saltcoats−Stevenston